Cyberarts or cyberart refers to the class of art produced with the help of computer software and hardware, often with an interactive or multimedia aspect.

Overview
The term "cyberarts" is vague and relatively new; nevertheless, much of the work described by this term is rarely described any other way. For instance, a common type of cyberart which is produced programmatically by applying a set of design rules to a natural or preexisting process. A program could produce a few million such 'works of art' in a minute.

The word "CyberArts" is claimed as a registered trademark by Miller Freeman Inc., promoter of a series of muti-media technology conferences known as CyberArts International during the early 1990s.

″Recent works of bioart propose to connect the viewer, transformed into a user, with different biological organisms by pirating their biometric data using digital interfaces. These immersive aesthetic propositions are based on a plural conception of the human body, forged in the crucible of cybernetics. Their new modes of communication explore the alternative path of an ecological continuum where the user enters a becoming-cyborg, far from the classic representations of human-machine coupling. They encourage us to reconsider the notion of bioart, in favor of cyberart.″

See also
 Digital art, computer art, Internet art, electronic art, new media art, Virtual art
 electronica, techno
 Ars Electronica
 Boston Cyberarts Festival
 CyberArts International

References

External links
Cybernet glossary
April 1999 essay by a skeptical Christopher Green on the topic of cyberart
Definition and description of cyberart by cyberart pioneer Rodney Chang (Pygoya)